Seohaeicola  saemankumensis is a Gram-negative and non-motile bacterium from the genus of Seohaeicola which has been isolated from tidal flat sediments from the Yellow Sea from Korea.

References 

Rhodobacteraceae
Bacteria described in 2009